This is a timeline documenting events of Jazz in the year 1905.

Events

 Sidney Bechet becomes the protege of clarinetist George Baquet and sits in with the band of trumpeter Freddie Keppard at the age of eight .

Standards

Births

 January
 13 – Percy Humphrey, American trumpeter and bandleader (died 1995).

 February
 6 – Jan Werich, Czech singer, actor, playwright, and writer (died 1980).
 10 – Chick Webb, American jazz and swing music drummer as well as a band leader (died 1939).
 11 – Lebert Lombardo, Canadian trumpeter and singer (died 1993).
 22 – Arthur Whetsel, American trumpeter (died 1940).

 March
 3 – Fernand Coppieters, Belgian pianist and organist (died 1981).
 12 – Chelsea Quealey, American trumpeter (died 1950).

 April
 15 – Bernard Addison, American guitarist (died 1990).
 19 – Tommy Benford, American drummer (died 1994).

 May
 7 – Georgie Stoll, American musical director, conductor, composer, and violinist (died 1985).
 18 –  Richard McPartland, American guitarist (died 1957).

 June
 13 –  Doc Cheatham, American trumpeter, singer, and bandleader (died 1997).
 17 – Don Kirkpatrick, American jazz pianist and arranger (died 1956).

 July
 8 – Walter Barnes, American clarinetist, saxophonist and bandleader (died 1940).
 9 – Martha Boswell, American singer, Boswell Sisters (died 1958).
 10 – Ivie Anderson, American singer (died 1949).

 August
 20 – Jack Teagarden, American trombonist and singer (died 1964).
 24 – Alphonse Trent, American jazz pianist and territory band leader (died 1959).

 October
 25 – Reuben Reeves, American trumpeter and bandleader (died 1955).

 November
 16 – Eddie Condon, American banjoist, guitarist, and bandleader (died 1973).
 19 – Tommy Dorsey, American trombonist, composer, conductor and bandleader (died 1956).
 22 – Cecil Scott, American clarinetist, tenor saxophonist, and bandleader (died 1964).
 24 – Harry Barris, American singer, pianist, and songwriter (died 1962).

 December
 25 –  Ann Ronell, American composer and lyricist (died 1993).
 29 –  Snub Mosley, American trombonist (died 1981).

 Unknown date
 Herb Morand, American jazz trumpeter (died 1952).
 Tamara Drasin, American singer (died 1943).

References

External links
 History Of Jazz Timeline: 1905 at All About Jazz

Jazz, 1905 In
Jazz by year